Antonio Martín Velasco (24 May 1970 – 11 February 1994) was a Spanish professional road bicycle racer from 1992 until his death in 1994.

Martín began his career in 1983 at Torrelaguna's cycling school.  He remained there until 1985, attaining recognition at the junior and amateur levels.  In 1992, he competed for the first time on the professional level, signing a group representing Amaya Seguros (Amaya Insurance) for the 1992 and 1993 seasons. While riding for team Amaya Seguros, he won the young rider classification in the 1993 Tour de France. He finished in 12th place overall.

On 11 February 1994, shortly after signing with the prestigious team , Martín was killed in a road accident while training.

References

External links
Biography from Torrelaguna's website

1970 births
1994 deaths
Spanish male cyclists
Road incident deaths in Spain
Cycling road incident deaths
People from Sierra Norte, Madrid
Cyclists from the Community of Madrid